The Encompass Insurance Pro-Am of Tampa Bay was a golf tournament on the Champions Tour. It was played annually in April in Lutz, Florida at the TPC Tampa Bay. Outback Steakhouse was the main sponsor of the tournament from 2004 to 2011.

The purse for the 2012 tournament was US$1,600,000, with $240,000 going to the winner. The tournament was founded in 1988 as the GTE Suncoast Classic.

Winners
Encompass Insurance Pro-Am of Tampa Bay
2012 Michael Allen

Outback Steakhouse Pro-Am
2011 John Cook
2010 Bernhard Langer
2009 Nick Price
2008 Tom Watson
2007 Tom Watson
2006 Jerry Pate
2005 Hale Irwin
2004 Mark McNulty

Verizon Classic
2003 Bruce Fleisher
2002 Doug Tewell
2001 Bob Gilder

GTE Classic
2000 Bruce Fleisher
1999 Larry Nelson
1998 Jim Albus
1997 David Graham

GTE Suncoast Classic
1996 Jack Nicklaus
1995 Dave Stockton
1994 Rocky Thompson
1993 Jim Albus
1992 Jim Colbert
1991 Bob Charles
1990 Mike Hill
1989 Bob Charles
1988 Dale Douglass

External links
Official website
PGATOUR.com Tournament website

Former PGA Tour Champions events
Golf in Florida
Pro–am golf tournaments
Recurring sporting events established in 1988
Recurring sporting events disestablished in 2012
1988 establishments in Florida
2012 disestablishments in Florida